Tean Kam is a khum (commune) of Preah Netr Preah District in Banteay Meanchey Province in north-western Cambodia.

Villages

 Bantoat Baoh
 Tean Kam Lech
 Tean Kam Cheung
 Tean Kam Tboung
 Ou
 Ta Un

References

Communes of Banteay Meanchey province
Preah Netr Preah District